Ahmad Fuad Mohieddin (11 January 1926–5 June 1984) was the 42nd Prime Minister of Egypt from 2 January 1982 to 5 June 1984. He was a member of the Arab Socialist Union and was part of its secret unit, the Socialist Vanguard (Arabic: al-Tanzim al-Tali‘i), which was also called the Vanguard Organization.

Then he joined the National Democratic Party.

References

External links

1935 births
1984 deaths
20th-century prime ministers of Egypt
Health ministers of Egypt
National Democratic Party (Egypt) politicians
Governors of Giza
Governors of Alexandria
Governors of Sharqia
Arab Socialist Union (Egypt) politicians